John Hearsum (2 November 1852 – 21 July 1931) was an English cricketer. He played two first-class matches for Surrey in 1871.

See also
 List of Surrey County Cricket Club players

References

External links
 

1852 births
1931 deaths
English cricketers
Surrey cricketers
Cricketers from Chelsea, London